Pakistan formally consummated diplomatic ties with Kyrgyzstan on May 10, 1992, although relations were initially founded on December 20, 1991, shortly after Kyrgyzstan became independent of the Soviet Union. Consequently, Pakistan opened its diplomatic outpost in Bishkek in 1995. 

Both nations are members of the same regional polity while being simultaneously affiliated with significant organizations like the United Nations (UN), Shanghai Cooperation Organisation (SCO), Economic Cooperation Organization (ECO), Organization of Islamic Cooperation (OIC) and G-77 among others.

At the same time, they are even signatories of numerous Agreements, MoUs, Treaties & Protocols. These broadly encompass the reciprocal promotion and protection of investment, cooperation in academics, avoidance of double taxation, air services and bilateral political consultations between the respective Ministries of Foreign Affairs.

In 1991, both countries signed an agreement for the promotion and expansion of economic and cultural ties. They share cultural affinity with the Mughal Empire whose founder - Zaheer ud Din Babur - was born in the territory that today forms Kyrgyzstan's Osh region/oblast.

Apex grade interactions
An enviable warmth has been demonstrated in recent times, primarily defined through the exchange of VVIP-tier interface. Foreign Minister Makhdoom Shah Mahmood Qureshi had visited Bishkek spanning May 21 & 22, 2019 to attend the SCO Council of Foreign Ministers. During his sojourn, Foreign Minister Qureshi was afforded the opportunity to hold delegation-grade talks with Kyrgyz counterpart, Chingiz Aiderbekov Azamatovich. 

The foreign ministers’ meet was followed by the SCO Council of Heads of State – that too in Bishkek - which was partaken by Prime Minister Imran Khan on June 13 & 14, 2019. Here he met President Sooronbai Jeenbekov. Prime Minister Imran Khan briefed President Jeenbekov on Pakistan’s strategic location and expressed his desire to open overland and air routes to bestride both nations. On the periphery of the Shanghai Cooperation Organisation (SCO) Summit, Prime Minister Muhammad Shehbaz Sharif met President Sadyr Japarov Nurgozhoevich on September 15, 2022, in Samarkand.

Capacity building programs

Pakistan has made available training facilities to Kyrgyz citizens across quite a few spheres of activity. This gesture has gained traction with novice and mid-career diplomats having thus far benefited from training apparatuses at our Foreign Service Academy (FSA). These programs have been complemented by training options provided to Kyrgyz state functionaries at the Postal Staff College Islamabad, National Institute of Banking and Finance, Pakistan Railways Academy, Revenue Collection, Forestry & Agriculture, and English Language at the National University of Modern Languages (NUML). Pakistan is offering two scholarships to Kyrgyz pupils every year in the discipline of BSc. Engineering. This gesture is being sponsored under the auspices of the Pakistan Technical Assistance Programme (PTAP).

References

 
Pakistan
Bilateral relations of Pakistan